The 1968–69 Oakland Seals season was the Seals' second season in the National Hockey League. For the first time in their history they qualified for the Stanley Cup playoffs after finishing second in the West Division, with a record of 26-36-11. They were upset in the playoffs, losing their quarter-finals series to the fourth-place Los Angeles Kings in seven games (Oakland's three playoff game victories against Los Angeles were the only ones the franchise would get in their entire ten-year history).

Off-season
Frank Selke, Jr. was named general manager of the team, replacing Bert Olmstead. Selke hired Fred Glover as coach. Rumors persisted over the off-season that the team would be sold to brothers Northrup and Seymour Knox III and moved to Buffalo.

Amateur draft

Regular season
Early in 1969 the Knox brothers did buy a 20% stake in the team; the remaining 80% was purchased by Trans-National Communications, a holding company based in New York City. The sale was $4.5 million: $1.6 million for Seals outright; $1.9 million in debt; the remaining expansion expansion fee due to the NHL; a $680,000 loan to Labatt Brewery; an undisclosed sum to Hockey Investors Inc. (their role in the sale was not disclosed); and settlements to Rudy Pilous, Bert Olmstead, and Gord Fashoway.

The Seals finished the season with a record of 26 wins, 36 losses, and 11 ties, second in the West Division. Attendance averaged 4,584 per game.

Norm Ferguson scored 34 goals, tying him with Danny Grant for the most by an NHL rookie (set by Nels Stewart in 1925–26. Ferguson finished second to Grant in voting for the Calder Memorial Trophy as rookie-of-the-year. Ted Hampson won the Bill Masterton Memorial Trophy for "exemplifies the qualities of perseverance, sportsmanship, and dedication to hockey". This would be the only major NHL trophy a Seal player would win. Hampson also finished second overall in voting for the Lady Byng Memorial Trophy for sportsmanship.

Final standings

Record vs. opponents

Schedule and results

 Game played at Cow Palace in Daly City.

Player statistics

Skaters
Note: GP = Games played; G = Goals; A = Assists; Pts = Points; PIM = Penalties in minutes

†Denotes player spent time with another team before joining Seals. Stats reflect time with the Seals only. ‡Traded mid-season

Goaltenders
Note: GP = Games played; TOI = Time on ice (minutes); W = Wins; L = Losses; T = Ties; GA = Goals against; SO = Shutouts; GAA = Goals against average

Transactions
The Seals were involved in the following transactions during the 1968–69 season:

Trades

Additions and subtractions

Playoffs
The Seals made it into the playoffs and went against Los Angeles in the Quarter-finals in a best of seven series and lost in 7 games, or 3–4.

References

Bibliography

 

 Seals on Hockey Database
 Seals on Database Hockey

California Golden Seals seasons
Oakland
Oakland